Uzun Darreh-ye Sofla (also Romanized as Ūzūn Darreh-ye Soflá and Oozoon Darreh Sofla; also known as Ūzūn Darreh-ye Pā’īn) is a village in Akhtachi-ye Gharbi Rural District, in the Central District of Mahabad County, West Azerbaijan Province, Iran. At the 2006 census, its population was 260, in 41 families.

References 

Populated places in Mahabad County